The Wild About Fruit Company is an Australian fruit company, located in Victoria's prime produce area, the Yarra Valley. The company is owned and operated by a third generation of the Mould family. Its main operations take place in Wandin with other properties located at Coldstream, Bacchus Marsh, Gundagai, New South Wales and Kerang. As of 2002, it was growing 40 different of cherries for the domestic and export fresh cherry market.

Wild About Fruit has worked closely with the CSIRO in crating painted juice production, developing juice extraction techniques that allowed a greater percentage of the fruit to be utilised, and deactivating enzymes that would result in a longer shelf-life for the product without the use of preservatives.

In 2004, Wild About Fruit products were endorsed by Planet Ark.

In September 2005, EPA Victoria fined Wild Juice Pty Ltd $5113 for contravening the requirements of a pollution abatement notice. In May, an EPA inspection had identified an incomplete connection of the site's new waste treatment plant.

Brands 
 Wild About Fruit
 Wild Child
 Wild about wellbeing

References

 

Food and drink companies of Australia
Companies based in Victoria (Australia)